Schousboe is a Danish surname. Notable people with the surname include:

 Peter Schousboe (1766–1832), Danish botanist
 Torben Schousboe (1937–2017), Danish music researcher and writer

Danish-language surnames